Geoffrey McSkimming (born 1 January 1962) is an Australian children's novelist and poet. He is the author of the 20 volume Cairo Jim chronicles and Jocelyn Osgood jaunts and the Phyllis Wong series of mystery novels. He has also published three volumes of poetry.

McSkimming was born in Sydney, Australia. To write his Cairo Jim stories, he travelled to Egypt, Peru, Tanzania (including Zanzibar), Greece, Mexico, Turkey, Italy and Singapore and other locations. He is much in demand for author talks, and appears with his wife, the magician Sue-Anne Webster, to promote the Phyllis Wong mysteries series.

Geoffrey McSkimming has published more than seventy short stories in magazines and has contributed verse to various poetry anthologies. He narrated the Cairo Jim chronicles as audio books for Bolinda Publishing. The audio version of his book of verse, Ogre in a Toga and Other Perverse Verses, was shortlisted in the Audie Awards (US) in 2008. He wrote five character tours which were performed in the galleries at the Art Gallery of NSW in Sydney, Australia, from 2000 through 2013. In June 2006 Geoffrey McSkimming undertook an author tour of the UK for Walker Books, who released ten titles in the Cairo Jim series in the UK.

Geoffrey McSkimming's 25th novel, Phyllis Wong and the Crumpled Stranger, was published in 2020 by 9 Diamonds Press. He is currently writing the eighth story in the Phyllis Wong Time Detective mysteries series.

All titles in the Cairo Jim chronicles are now e-published by 9 Diamonds Press, as well as new print editions. A completely new Cairo Jim novel, Cairo Jim and the Portal of Peristophanes -- The Return of Cairo Jim, was published in October 2021.
Geoffrey McSkimming is an avid collector and reader of first editions of Victorian and Edwardian detective and mystery fiction, with a particular interest in the works of Fergus Hume.

Geoffrey McSkimming is represented by Curtis Brown Literary Agency, London.

Books
 Cairo Jim and the Portal of Peristophanes -- The Return of Cairo Jim (2021)
 Phyllis Wong and the Crumpled Stranger (2020)
 Phyllis Wong and the Vanishing Emeralds (2018)
 Phyllis Wong and the Girl who Danced with Lightning (2017)
 The Startling Tale of Hamlet, Prince of Denmark (2016)
 Phyllis Wong and the Pockets of the Shadows (2016)
 Phyllis Wong and the Waking of the Wizard (2015; e-book and revised edition 2018)
 Phyllis Wong and the Return of the Conjuror (2014; e-book and revised edition 2018)    
 Phyllis Wong and the Secrets of Mr. Okyto (2012; e-book and revised edition 2018)  
 Ogre in a Toga and Other Perverse Verses (2008)    
 Cairo Jim and the Astragals of Angkor (2007; e-book 2017)
 Cairo Jim at the Crossroads of Orpheus (2006; e-book 2017)
 Cairo Jim and the Sumptuous Stash of Silenus (2005; e-book 2017)
 Cairo Jim and Jocelyn Osgood in Bedlam from Bollywood (2004; e-book 2017)
 Cairo Jim and the Rorting of Rameses' Regalia (2003; e-book 2017)
 Cairo Jim and the Chaos from Crete (2002; e-book 2017)
 Cairo Jim and the Tyrannical Bauble of Tiberius (2001; e-book 2017)
 Cairo Jim and the Lagoon of Tidal Magnificence (2000; e-book 2016)
 Cairo Jim Amidst the Petticoats of Artemis (2000; e-book 2016)
 Cairo Jim and the Secret Sepulchre of the Sphinx (1999; e-book 2016)
 Jocelyn Osgood in Ascent into Asgard (1998)
 Cairo Jim and the Quest for the Quetzal Queen (1997; e-book 2016)
 Cairo Jim's Bumper Book of Flabbergasting Fragments (1996)
 Cairo Jim and the Alabastron of Forgotten Gods (1996; e-book 2016)
 Jocelyn Osgood and the Xylophones above Zarundi (1995)
 Cairo Jim and the Sunken Sarcophagus of Sekheret (1994; e-book 2016)
 Jocelyn Osgood - After the Puce Empress (1993)
 Cairo Jim on the Trail to ChaCha Muchos (1992; e-book 2016)
 Cairo Jim & Doris in Search of Martenarten (1991; e-book 2016)

His Cairo Jim and Jocelyn Osgood books have been published in many different languages in Australia, United Kingdom, Japan, Korea, Portugal, Germany, Italy, Poland, Russia, Hungary, and New Zealand.

Inspiration
"When Geoffrey McSkimming was a boy he found an old motion-picture projector and a tin containing a dusty home movie in his grandmother's attic. He screened the film and was transfixed by the flickering image of a man in a jaunty pith helmet, baggy Sahara shorts and special desert sun-spectacles. The man had an imposing macaw and a clever looking camel, and Geoffrey Mcskimming was mesmerised by their activities in black-and-white Egypt, Peru, Greece, Mexico, Sumatra, Turkey, Italy and other exotic locations.

Years later he discovered the identities of the trio, and has spent much of his time since then retracing their footsteps, interviewing surviving members of the Old Relics Society, and gradually reconstructing the lost true tales of Cairo Jim, which have become the enormously successful Cairo Jim chronicles."

References

External links 
Official Geoffrey McSkimming website for the Phyllis Wong mysteries
Official Geoffrey McSkimming website
Official Geoffrey McSkimming website for the Cairo Jim chronicles
9 Diamonds Press

1962 births
Living people
Australian children's writers